Felisha Cooper (born September 8, 1988) is an American actress. She is known for her role as Sasha Thompson on The Bold and the Beautiful.

Early life and education
Cooper was born in Fayetteville, North Carolina to Kimberly Gibson (née Johnson), a culinary teacher and the late Gene Cooper, a drill sergeant for the United States Army. She has two siblings, an older sister, Paris and a younger brother, Bobby.

Career
With her first known television appearance being as a contestant on Celebrity Name Game, Cooper was discovered by manager Elaine Lively just three weeks after moving to Los Angeles, California. She landed her first film role playing head cheerleader Alexis "Lexi" Andersen in the horror-comedy film All Cheerleaders Die. She also had a prominent role on Criminal Minds as Laurie Patterson in the show's ninth season, episode 11, "Bully." Viaplay produced a TV show Swedish Dicks with Peter Stormare and with Cooper in a bi-role.

Awards and nominations

References

External links

Actresses from North Carolina
Living people
1992 births
21st-century American women